The Austrian Congregation is a congregation of Benedictine monasteries situated in Austria, within the Benedictine Confederation.

History
The Congregation was founded on 3 August 1625 by Pope Urban VIII, and consisted of eleven Benedictine monasteries in Austria:
Altenburg Abbey
Garsten Abbey
Gleink Abbey
Göttweig Abbey
Kleinmariazell Abbey
Kremsmünster Abbey
Lambach Abbey
Melk Abbey
Mondsee Abbey
Schottenstift, Vienna
Seitenstetten Abbey

Salzburg Congregation
These were however not all the Benedictine monasteries of present-day Austria. Those in the Diocese of Salzburg were formed in 1641 into the Salzburg Congregation, consisting of:
Admont Abbey
Michaelbeuern Abbey
Ossiach Abbey
St. Paul's Abbey in the Lavanttal
St. Peter's Abbey, Salzburg

The diocese also then included two further monasteries, the locations of which are now in Bavaria in Germany:

St. Vitus' Abbey on the Rott
Seeon Abbey

Salzburg was secularised and became part of Austria in 1816.

Later history
Several of these abbeys ceased to exist as a result of the dissolution of monasteries enforced by Emperor Joseph II in the 1780s.

Some survived, however, and the 19th century brought a revival in the monastic movement. The two congregations were renewed by Pope Leo XIII on 23 August 1889 as the Congregations of Mary and Joseph respectively, and were combined as the present Austrian Congregation by Pope Pius XI on 8 December 1930.

Present Congregation
The Austrian Congregation (as of 2006) consists of the following monasteries in Austria:
Admont Abbey
Altenburg Abbey
Göttweig Abbey
Gut Aich Priory
Kremsmünster Abbey
Lambach Abbey
Melk Abbey
Michaelbeuern Abbey
Schottenstift, Vienna
Seitenstetten Abbey
St. Joseph's Priory, Maria Roggendorf
St. Lambrecht's Abbey
St. Paul's Abbey in the Lavanttal
St. Peter's Archabbey, Salzburg
Kolleg St. Benedikt (student house)

External links
 Website of the Austrian Benedictines
 The Confederation of Benedictine Congregations 

Benedictine congregations
Religious organizations established in 1625
Catholic religious institutes established in the 17th century
1625 establishments in Austria